Savati Koduku is a 1963 Indian Telugu-language drama film, produced and directed by Y. Ranga Rao. It stars N. T. Rama Rao and Sowcar Janaki, with music composed by debutant Satyam and T. V. Raju taking care of supervision.

Plot 
The film begins on a farmer Venkayya (Gummadi), after the death of his first wife he marries Laskmamma (Hemalatha) who treats her stepson Seshu (N. T. Rama Rao) as her own. Thereafter, the couple is blessed with a child Shekar. Years roll by, Venkayya strives and becomes wealthy. Seshu (N. T. Rama Rao) weds a wise lady Janaki (Sowcar Janaki) and administrates their farms. He dots upon his sibling Shekar (Brahmam) and aims to carve him as an advocate. So, he admits him in college along with their maternal uncle Subbarayudu's (Chadalawada) son Chal Mohan. (Relangi). But unfortunately, in the city, Shekar turns as a spoiled brat with the association of a dancer Vanaja (Rajaratnam). Learning it, Venkayya passes away. Before dying, he keeps the entire property on Seshu's name with an assurance to reform his brother. Meanwhile, Janaki's parents Gundarayudu (C.S.R) & his wife (Lakshmi Kantamma) come in and create a rift in the family which makes Laskmamma spurn from the house. But here, Seshu secretly safeguards his mother. Eventually, with the help of Chal Mohan, he relives Shekar from his vices. Now Shekar backs when Subbarayudu exploits him and make to confront his brother for the share. Thereupon. Shekar understands the virtue of his brother and seeks pardon. By the time, Chal Mohan brings out the devilish faces of Janaki's parents when she too realizes her mistake. Finally, the movie ends on a happy note with the reunion of the entire family.

Cast 
N. T. Rama Rao as Seshu
Sowcar Janaki as Janaki
Gummadi as Venkayya
Relangi as Chal Mohan
C.S.R as Gundarayudu
Chadalavada as Subbarayudu
Vangara as Papaiah Panthulu
Balakrishna
Brahmam as Shekar
Girija as Lalitha
Hemalatha as Lakshmamma
Vasanthi as Susheela
Lakshmi Kantamma
Rajaratnam as Vanaja

Soundtrack 

Music composed by Satyam. Lyrics were written by Bairagi.

References

External links 
 

Indian drama films
Films scored by Satyam (composer)
Films scored by T. V. Raju